The list of shipwrecks in 1962 includes all ships sunk, foundered, grounded, or otherwise lost during 1962.

January

3 January

7 January

8 January

9 January

11 January

15 January

16 January

17 January

20 January

21 January

23 January

31 January

Unknown date

February

1 February

5 February

6 February

7 February

9 February

11 February

28 February

Unknown date

March

4 March

8 March

11 March

12 March

14 March

15 March

16 March

24 March

25 March

26 March

27 March

28 March

29 March

30 March

Unknown date

April

3 April

6 April

15 April

18 April

19 April

21 April

30 April

May

5 May

7 May

15 May

23 May

24 May

28 May

June

9 June

14 June

15 June

30 June

July

6 July

7 July

18 July

30 July

Unknown date

August

1 August

3 August

4 August

8 August

22 August

25 August

26 August

28 August

30 August

September

1 September

2 September
Typhoon Wanda - twenty ships aground or sunk at Hong Kong, including -

4 September

6 September

7 September

13 September

14 September

20 September

21 September

28 September

30 September

October

1 October

7 October

12 October

13 October

21 October

22 October

26 October

28 October

29 October

November

2 November

10 November

11 November

14 November

16 November

17 November

18 November

23 November

25 November

28 November

29 November

Unknown date

December

2 December

5 December

8 December

16 December

18 December

20 December

23 December

30 December

Unknown date

References

See also 

1962
 
Ships